Bradt Travel Guides is a publisher of travel guides founded in 1974 by Hilary Bradt and her husband George, who co-wrote the first Bradt Guide on a river barge on a tributary of the Amazon.

Since then Bradt has grown into a leading independent travel publisher, with growth particularly in the last decade. It has a reputation for tackling destinations overlooked by other guide book publishers. Bradt guides have been cited by The Independent as covering "parts of the world other travel publishers don't reach", and nearly two-thirds of the guides on the publisher's list have no direct competition in English from other travel publishers.

These include guides to parts of Asia, Latin America and Africa, in particular, which traditionally have not been widely covered by guidebook publishers, or do not have a long history of tourism. Bradt also has an extensive list of regional European guides to destinations such as the Peloponnese, the Vendée and the Basque Country.

The guides give a brief summary of the history of the destination. Each guide then covers the basics such as geography and climate, wildlife, languages and culture, healthcare and media. Subsequent chapters are usually arranged on a geographical basis, addressing the main cities or regions of the destination in systematic order. According to Michael Palin: "Bradt Guides are expertly written and longer on local detail than any others".

Bradt guides are often written by writers who live in the country or region they are writing about or have travelled there extensively over many years, rather than professional travel writers. As such, they may be written somewhat unconventionally compared with normal tourist guides. Bradt guides often relay information about the nature of the local people, based on the experiences of the author. The health chapters are written in collaboration with a well-travelled doctor: Jane Wilson-Howarth or Felicity Nicholson.

In 2010 Bradt launched the Slow Travel series of UK regional guides, now 16 titles strong. And the publisher also has a list of travel narratives and nature writing from authors such as Jonathan Scott, Brian Jackman and Princess Michael of Kent.

Bradt Travel Guides is based in Chalfont St Peter in Buckinghamshire, England and co-publishes with Globe Pequot in Guilford, Connecticut in the United States.

Bradt has won or been shortlisted for many awards, including: Sunday Times Small Publisher of the Year in 1997; Gold Award in the Wanderlust Best Guidebook Awards in 2009, 2011, 2015, 2016, 2018 and 2019; Which? magazine's Top Recommended Travel Guide Publisher in 2011 and 2012; and a shortlisting for Independent Publisher of the Year at the British Book Awards, 2017. In 2008 Hilary Bradt was appointed an MBE for services to the Tourist Industry and to Charity.

In 2019, Bradt acquired competitor Footprint Travel Guides.

Countries/areas covered by the guides

Africa
Africa (overland)
Angola
Botswana
Burkina Faso
Cameroon
Cape Verde
Congo
Equatorial Guinea
Eritrea
Ethiopia
Gabon
The Gambia
Ghana
Ivory Coast
Kenya
Madagascar
Malawi
Mauritius (incl. Rodrigues and Réunion)
Mozambique
Namibia
Nigeria
Rwanda
São Tomé and Príncipe
Senegal
Seychelles
Sierra Leone
Somaliland
South Africa
South Sudan
Sudan
Swaziland
Tanzania (and Northern) and Zanzibar
Uganda
Zambia
Zimbabwe
Saint Helena, Ascension Island and Tristan da Cunha

Americas and Caribbean
Amazon
Argentina
Canada (Nova Scotia)
Chile 
Colombia
Dominica
Ecuador 
Falkland Islands
Grenada
Guyana
Haiti
Panama
Paraguay
Peru (Trekking)
Suriname
United States (Rail guide)
Uruguay
Venezuela

Wildlife
Antarctica
Arctic
Australia
British Isles
Central and Eastern Europe
China
Galápagos Islands
Madagascar
Pantanal
Peru
Southern Africa
Sri Lanka

Europe
Albania
Armenia (and Nagorno-Karabakh)
Azores
Belgium (Flanders, Mons and Waterloo)
Bosnia and Herzegovina
Bulgaria
Croatia (and Istria)
Cyprus (Northern)
Estonia
Faroe Islands
France (Lille, the Basque Country and the Vendée)
Georgia
Finland (Lapland)
Greece (Peloponnese)
Hungary
Iceland
Italy (Abruzzo, Emilia-Romagna and Liguria)
Kosovo
Luxembourg
Malta (and Gozo)
Montenegro
North Macedonia
Portugal (Alentejo)
Romania (Transylvania)
Scotland (Outer Hebrides)
Serbia
Slovenia
Slovakia (Bratislava)
Svalbard (Spitsbergen)
Sweden (West)
Switzerland (Rail, road and lake)
Ukraine
The Northern Lights
World War One Battlefields

Slow Guides to the United Kingdom 

Cornwall
Cheshire
Cotswolds
Devon (North Devon, South Devon, East Devon & the Jurassic Coast)
Dumfries and Galloway
New Forest
Norfolk
Northumberland
North York Moors and Yorkshire Wolds
Peak District
Shropshire 
Suffolk
Sussex
Yorkshire Dales

Asia, Central Asia and the Middle East
Bangladesh
Borneo
Iran
Iraq
Israel
Jordan
Kashmir
Kazakhstan
Kyrgyzstan
Maldives
Mongolia
North Korea
Oman
Palestine
Sri Lanka
Taiwan
Tajikistan
Tibet
Turkmenistan
Uzbekistan

References

External links
Official site

Travel guide books
Publishing companies established in 1974